The Parliamentary Centre (CP) was a political group in Spain formed by several times minister Manuel Alonso Martínez as a split from the Constitutional Party. Aligned with Antonio Cánovas del Castillo's Conservative Party from 1876 to 1879, it was later merged into the newly established Liberal Party of Práxedes Mateo Sagasta in 1880.

References

1875 establishments in Spain
1880 disestablishments in Spain
Defunct political parties in Spain
Political parties established in 1875
Political parties disestablished in 1880
Restoration (Spain)